RSPO may refer to:

Roundtable on Sustainable Palm Oil
Royal Stockholm Philharmonic Orchestra